Lux Occulta (which is Latin for "hidden light" or "the secrets of light") is a Polish avant-garde metal band, founded in late 1994. Their work, also strongly influenced by progressive metal and black metal, commonly incorporates elaborate arrangements often featuring multiple sections and unpredictable time changes.

Biography
The band was started when guitarists Peter and G'Ames, formerly of Blaspherion, asked Jaro.Slav, the vocalist of Haemorrhage, to join their new project. Jackie (bass guitar) and Aemil (drums) joined the band few weeks later, followed by keyboard player U'reck after the band's first rehearsal session. After the recording in 1996 of the band's first full album, Forever Alone, Immortal, Aemil was replaced by drummer Kriss. The band's second album, Dionysos, followed in 1997. In 1998, after the release of Maior Arcana, G'Ames and Jackie were asked to leave the band; their replacements were guitarist Vogg and bassist Martin, also of the Polish death metal band Decapitated. A lengthy recording succession with the new lineup yielded My Guardian Anger, which was released in 1999. The latter half of 1999 was plagued with accidents, though, as Kriss suffered from a broken arm, leading his doctors to question whether he would ever be able to play drums again, and U'reck broke his leg shortly thereafter, forcing the band to retire from touring for several months. After several months' hiatus from performing, the band played Poland's Metalmania festival in 2000 alongside acts such as Opeth, Behemoth and Tiamat, which drew the attention of the Portuguese label Maquiavel Music Entertainment. The next month they were signed to the label for a two-album deal, and the first of their albums on MME, The Mother and the Enemy, appeared the following year. The band has been mostly dormant since 2002, although in 2012 they posted a message to their MySpace some years afterward indicating that they were working on new material and looking for a new drummer. In 2014, they released their fifth studio album Kołysanki, which drastically departed from the avant–garde/black metal sound in the band’s previous albums.

Band members
Current members
Jarosław "Jaro.Slav" Szubrycht – vocals 
Jerzy "U.Reck" Głód – keyboards 
Wacław "Vogg" Kiełtyka – lead guitar 
Maciek Tomczyk – rhythm guitar 

Former members
"Aemil" – drums 
Grzegorz "G. Ames" Kapłon – lead guitar 
"Jackie" – bass 
Piotr "Peter" Szczurek – rhythm guitar 
Krzysztof "Kriss" Szantula – drums 
Marcin "Martin" Rygiel – bass 
Rafał "Kastor" Kastory – rhythm guitar

Timeline

Discography

Studio albums
 Forever Alone, Immortal (1996)
 Dionysos (1997)
 My Guardian Anger (1999)
 The Mother and the Enemy (2001)
 Kołysanki (2014)

Compilation albums
 Maior Arcana: The Words That Turn Flesh into Light (1998)

Demos
 The Forgotten Arts (1995)

References

Polish black metal musical groups
Polish symphonic metal musical groups
Polish progressive metal musical groups
Musical groups established in 1994
Symphonic black metal musical groups
Musical groups disestablished in 2002
Musical groups reestablished in 2011
Musical quartets
1994 establishments in Poland